John I, Duke of Brunswick-Grubenhagen (born: before 1322; died: 23 May 1367) was provost of the St. Alexandri Minster in Einbeck.

He was the son of Duke Henry I "the Marvelous" of Brunswick-Grubenhagen and his wife Agnes of Meissen, daughter of Margrave Albert II of Meissen.

Year of birth uncertain
1367 deaths
Princes of Grubenhagen
14th-century German Roman Catholic priests
Old House of Brunswick